Ian Sommerville may refer to:

 Ian Sommerville (academic) (born 1951), British computer scientist and author
 Ian Sommerville (technician) (1940-1976)